Mahmut Nedim Zabcı (1882 – 8 February 1955) was a Turkish educator, economist and politician.

References 

1882 births
1955 deaths
People from Malatya
Republican People's Party (Turkey) politicians
Turkish educators
Turkish economists